Baghan (also Romanized as Bāghān, Bāghīn, and Bāqān) is a village in Howmeh Rural District, in the Central District of Shirvan County, North Khorasan Province, Iran. At the 2006 census, its population was 528, in 161 families. Baghan was near the epicenter of the 1929 Kopet Dag earthquake.

References 

Populated places in Shirvan County